{{DISPLAYTITLE:C11H12N4O2S}}
The molecular formula C11H12N4O2S (molar mass: 264.304 g/mol, exact mass: 264.0681 u) may refer to:

 Sulfamerazine
 Sulfaperin

Molecular formulas